The Dhahan Prize is an annual prize awarded by Canada-India education society for excellence in Punjabi fiction. The prize is given to three books of fiction, written in either Gurmukhi or Shahmukhi script of Punjabi. The prize is named after Canadian Punjabi businessman, Barj Singh Dhahan.

2014 winners
 Avtar Singh Billing for Khali Khoohaan di Katha - Winner
Jasbir Bhullar for Ek Raat Da Samundar - Runner-up
Zubair Ahmed for Kabutar, Banaire Te Galian - Runner-up

2015 winners 

Darshan Singh for Lota - Winner
Harjeet Atwal for Mor Udaari - Runner-up
Nain Sukh for Madho Lal Hussain - Lahore Di Vel - Runner-up

2016 winners
Jarnail Singh for Kaale Varke - Winner
Zahid Hassan for Tassi Dharti - Runner-up
Simran Dhaliwal for Us Pal - Runner-up

2017 winners 

Pargat Singh Satauj for Khabar Ik Pind Di - Winner
Ali Anwar Ahmed for Filthy Chador - Runner-up
Nachhattar Singh Brar for Paper Marriage - Runner-up

2018 winners 

Baldev Singh Sadaknama for Sooraj Di Akh - Winner
Harpreet Sekha for Prism - Runner-up
Nasir Abbas Baloch for Jhootha Sacha Koi Na - Runner-up

2019 winners 

Jatinder Singh Haans for Jyona Sach Baki Jhooth - Winner
Gurdev Singh Rupana for Aam Khas - Runner-up
Mudassar Bashir for Kaun - Runner-up

2020 winners 
 Kesra Ram for Zanani Paud - Winner
 Harkirat Kaur Chahal for Aadem-Grehen - Runner-up
 Zubair Ahmed for Panni Di Kandh - Runner-up

2021 winners 
 Nain Sukh for Jogi, Sap, Trah (Short Stories) - Winner
 Balbir Madhopuri for Mitti Bol Peye (Novel) - Runner-up
 Sarghi Jammu for Apne Apne Marseia (Short Stories) - Runner-up

References

External links
 Official website

Indian literary awards
Canadian literary awards